Tyrone House is a Georgian mansion townhouse built for Marcus Beresford, 1st Earl of Tyrone in 1740. It was constructed on lands bordering Marlborough Street (formerly Tyrone Street) in what was to become a fashionable part of North Dublin city off Sackville Street. It was the first substantial aristocratic house built on the North side of Dublin city.

The house was situated overlooking Marlborough Bowling Green and Pleasure Gardens, which was then a fashionable enclave where the wealthy elite could socialize until it fell out of favour following the death of Lord Delvin in a duel in 1761.

History 

The area surrounding the house became fashionable due to the existence of the Marlborough Bowling Green and Pleasure Gardens. As early as 1753, a musical evening and fireworks display is recorded as having occurred to raise funds for the construction of a wooden bridge across the Liffey to benefit the wealthy patrons south of the river.

The 1st earl died at the house in 1763 and the house was left to his son, George Beresford, styled the marquess of Waterford in 1789. As a result, the house was often called Waterford House on maps during that period.

Nearby Beresford Place was later named in honour of the first earl's grandson, John Claudius Beresford upon its construction in the 1790s.

In 1834 the house and five adjoining acres were sold for £7,000 to the National Education Commissioners. The house later became part of the Department of Education's campus which also encompasses the original model school as well as a facsimile of the altered version of Tyrone House, both of which were designed by Jacob Owen a few years after the purchase.

As of 2022, the house has been partially restored to its former glory and is an administrative building which forms part of the Department of Education's main campus. An illustrated image of the house often features as part of the logo on the headed notepaper and official correspondence issued by the department.

Tyrone Ghost Story 
A well-known ghost story relates to the house concerning the appearance of Lord Tyrone as a ghost to prove the existence of life after death.

Design and construction 
The house was built in 1740 to a design by Richard Cassels and was said to be his first stone-fronted free-standing house in Dublin. Later, the house was altered by Jacob Owen in 1835 adding a prostyle tetrastyle granite portico and removing the central front venetian window on the first floor while leaving much of the house unchanged. The house is mainly faced in granite ashlar with calp ashlar walls at the basement level while the house still features some of its original Portland stone sills.

The elaborate interior stucco work is generally attributed to the Lafranchini brothers and contrasts with the severe limestone exterior.

The house was surrounded by a high wall but these were replaced with the present iron railings when the house was developed by the Department of Education in 1836.

References 

Buildings and structures in Dublin (city)
Georgian architecture in Ireland